is a Japanese manga series written by Riku Sanjo and illustrated by Masaki Sato. It is a manga sequel to the tokusatsu live-action drama Kamen Rider W, which originally aired in 2009 as part of Toei Company's Kamen Rider franchise. It has been serialized in Shogakukan's Big Comic Spirits since August 2017, with its chapters collected in thirteen tankōbon volumes as of August 2022. An anime television series adaptation by Studio Kai, Toei, and Ishimori Entertainment aired from August to October 2022.

Plot
Taking place after Kamen Rider W Returns: Kamen Rider Accel, two years after the main TV series' finale, Fuuto PI sees the return of Shotaro Hidari, a private detective who works at Narumi Detective Agency, and his partner Raito "Philip" Sonozaki, the sole survivor of the Sonozaki family who can access the Gaia Library. Together they transform into Kamen Rider W, who protects the city of Fuuto from Dopants, monsters created by Gaia Memories. They solve cases alongside their boss Akiko Terui, who often joins their investigations with her husband Ryu (a member of the police force who is also Kamen Rider Accel).

One day, Shotaro encounters an amnesiac pink-haired girl named Tokime, who is being targeted by Dopants. After saving her, they decided to hire her at Narumi Detective Agency as their assistant. As Shotaro and Philip solve more cases, they gradually uncover Tokime's connection with the mysterious Aurora Dopant and her past life, along with the true potential of Gaia Memories' next stage used by Dopants in their human forms, dubbed High Dopes.

Characters

Main characters

Kamen Rider Double (alternatively Kamen Rider W) is the titular duo of Shotaro Hidari and Philip who can fuse with each other and transform via. the Doubledriver and their own set of purified Gaia Memories. Their individual Drivers are linked, such that Philip's consciousness is transferred into Shotaro's body along with the former's Gaia Memory. As such, Double's ability to function is dependent on the condition of its components, as any physical or mental disruption could affect Double's mobility or cancel the transformation entirely. Although Shotaro serves as the primary host body for Double, exceptions to these when using a Fang Memory to which Philip serves as host, while CycloneJoker Xtreme fuses both their bodies and souls into one. If either Double’s halves are unavailable each of Double’s halves can use Lostdrivers to transform into Kamen Rider Joker and Cyclone respective.

The man of the streets, a  non-standard "hard-boiled private eye" who emulates famous pulp fiction private eye characters, and possesses a sharp intuition that allows him to regularly deduce the culprit behind a crime before having Philip provide evidence to confirm his suspicions. Vowing to ensure that no one ever feels sad, Shotaro became a protégé of Fuuto's private investigator Sokichi Narumi after admiring his work as a child. Due to Shotaro being incapable of making cold-hearted decisions most of the time due to his kindhearted nature and refusal to conform to the stereotypes of characters from the Detective Noir tales he emulates, he is fraudulently considered "half-boiled" by his boss Akiko despite this frequently being disproven and his way to approaching cases proven time and again to be the correct ones. He controls Kamen Rider Double's left side, which he can change into three different fighting styles by changing Gaia Memories; Joker for hand-to-hand combat, Metal for melee weapon combat, and Trigger for long-range projectile combat. Shotaro can also become Kamen Rider Joker, whenever Philip is unavailable to fuse with Shotaro as Kamen Rider Double.

Shotaro's partner in the Narumi Detective Office who used to have amnesia, has a tendency for obsessively focusing on a specific topic of interest, and uses his special abilities to access the Gaia Library to solve Dopant crimes. He was originally , the third child and only son of the Sonozaki family who died after falling into the Earth's consciousness, the True Gaia Memory, and revived as an ageless data human. His soul transfers to Shotaro's body when transformed as Kamen Rider Double, during which he controls the right side with three Gaia Memories that apply different elemental properties to Shotaro's combat forms: Cyclone for wind, Heat for fire, and Luna for reality bending. In addition to these forms, Philip can also use the Fang Memory which turns him into Kamen Rider Double's main body instead of Shotaro, and can now change to two other regular left half forms aside an offensive agile FangJoker, such as a defensive spiky FangMetal, and an auto-aimable archer FangTrigger. Philip used to transform into Kamen Rider Cyclone during The One Who Continues After Z novel event.

A mysterious, pink-haired amnesiac girl and thief who possesses supernatural powers, believes herself to be a witch as such. Initially a suspect for a brutal killing spree before she is proven innocent and a target of the Street crime syndicate, she eventually comes to work for the Narumi Detective Office as an assistant. It is later revealed she was once a member of Street who possessed the Joker Dopant Memory.
  

A superintendent of the Fuuto PD's Paranormal Crime Division and Akiko's husband. He also fights against Dopants by transforming into Kamen Rider Accel, which also gives him the ability to transform himself into a bike-like form. In addition to Accel's base form, he can change into the high-speed Trial form and the rocket-powered Booster form.

The head of the Narumi Detective office and Shotaro's boss, despite having a young appearance and childish attitude due to having inherited the agency after the death of her father, Sokichi Narumi. In addition to being the de-facto boss, she serves as a personal assistant while on the job due to her own incompetence as a detective; contrasting against the competence at the job shown by Shotaro that was inherited from Sokichi. Akiko also serves as both mediator and annoying little sister toward Shotaro, Philip, and Tokime. She is also Ryu's wife, the two marrying during the crossover film event "Kamen Rider × Kamen Rider OOO & W Featuring Skull: Movie War Core"

Antagonists

The leader of Street who was formerly the CEO of the human resource development corporation Chi Operations, one of Foundation X's parent organizations. With the Aurora Memory and a Gaia Driver Rex, Bando can transform into the Aurora Dopant. While transformed, he can fire a powerful energy beam from his hand.

A member of Street who transforms into the Scream Dopant. When transformed, she can emit powerful screams.

A member of Street who transforms into the Brachiosaurus Dopant. When transformed, he becomes a gigantic skeletal brachiosaurus.

A member of Streets who transforms into the Reactor Dopant. When transformed, he can wield the extreme heat of a nuclear reactor.

Media

Manga
Fuuto PI, written by Riku Sanjo and illustrated by Masaki Sato, started in Shogakukan's seinen manga magazine Big Comic Spirits on August 7, 2017. Shogakukan has collected its chapters into individual tankōbon volumes. The first volume was released on March 30, 2018. As of August 30, 2022, thirteen volumes have been released.

Volume list

Chapters not yet in tankōbon format

Anime
An anime television series adaptation was announced on April 3, 2021. The series was animated by Studio Kai. Yousuke Kabashima is directing the series, with Tatsuto Higuchi handling series' composition, Hidekazu Ebina designing the characters, and Kōtarō Nakagawa and Shuhei Naruse composing the series' music. The series debuted on the U-NEXT service on August 1, 2022, before premiering on Tokyo MX on August 8. The opening theme song is "Private Eye" by Big Gadgets ft. The series was initially licensed by Funimation but was moved to Crunchyroll following Sony's acquisition of the platform. Muse Communication licensed the series in Southeast Asia.

Episode list

Reception
As of May 2018, the manga had 300,000 copies in circulation. As of December 2018, the manga had 1.05 million copies in circulation.

The series ranked #15 on Kono Manga ga Sugoi! 2019 ranking of Top 20 manga for male readers. The series ranked #8 on Honya Club's "Nationwide Bookstore Employees' Recommended Comics of 2018".

Notes

References

External links
  
  
 

2022 anime television series debuts
Anime series based on manga
Crunchyroll anime
Detective anime and manga
Kamen Rider
Muse Communication
Mystery anime and manga
Seinen manga
Shogakukan manga
Studio Kai
Supernatural anime and manga
Tokyo MX original programming